Rolland Fisher (1900-1982) was a minister and evangelist who actively promoted the temperance movement. He was Executive Secretary of the Kansas Prohibition Party in 1948–1950, was State Chairman of the party in 1962–1968, was Vice-Chairman of the Prohibition National Committee in 1963–1967, and was the Prohibition Party candidate for Vice-President of the United States in 1968.

References

American temperance activists
1900 births
1982 deaths
Kansas Prohibitionists
Activists from Kansas